E. Ann McGee is an American academic, and the current President of Seminole State College of Florida. McGee graduated with her bachelor's degree in speech from Florida State University. She received her master's degree from Florida State University in communications.  In addition she received her doctorate from Nova Southeastern University. In 1996, she became Seminole State's second president.

Awards
 Marie Y. Martin "Top CEO" by the Association of Community College Trustees, 2006
 Phi Theta Kappa's Shirley B. Gordon Award of Distinction, 2005
 Seminole County Chamber of Commerce Lifetime Achievement Award, 2004
 One of the Top 100 Most Influential People in Central Florida by The Orlando Business Journal
 "Most Outstanding Graduate" by St. Petersburg College, 2009

External links
 President McGee's official bio

Year of birth missing (living people)
Living people
Seminole State College of Florida
Nova Southeastern University alumni
American educators
Florida State University alumni